Martin Harris (born 1969) is an English former International competitive swimmer and backstroke specialist.

Swimming career
Harris represented Great Britain in international championships during the 1990s, spanning 12 years, swimming at 2x Olympics 1992, 1996,  3x FINA World Long Course championships, and 5x FINA world Short Course championships silver Medal 100m backstroke 1993 3x European LC championships bronze medal 100m backstroke 1995 and England 3x at the Commonwealth Games. 1994 - Gold 100m backstroke, 1994 Bronze medley relay, 1998 silver 4x100m medley relay, 2002. During his career, Harris broke more than 50 British long and short course swimming records.

At the 1992 Summer Olympics in Barcelona, Spain, Harris competed in the men's 100-metre backstroke,.  He also swam for the sixth-place British men's team in the 4x100-metre medley relay in the qualifying heats.  Thereafter, he became a fixture on the British 4x100-metre medley relay team, winning bronze medals in the medley relay at the 1993 European championships and the 100m backstroke silver medalist 1993 FINA short course world championships.

Harris represented England at the 1994, 1998, and 2002 Commonwealth Games. In the 1994 Games in Victoria, British Columbia, Harris won a gold medal in the 100-metre backstroke, and a bronze as a member of the English team in the 4x100-metre medley relay.  Representing Great Britain at the 1996 Summer Olympics in Atlanta, he qualified for both the 100-metre and 200-metre backstroke.

Harris earned silver medal in the 100m backstroke at the 1993 FINA world short course championships in Palma and another bronze medal with the British team in the 4x100-metre medley relay at the 1997 FINA short course world championships.  Harris won a silver medal as a member of the English team in the 4x100-metre medley relay, and 4th in the 100m backstroke at the 1998 Commonwealth Games in Kuala Lumpur, Malaysia.

At the ASA National British Championships, he won the 50 metres backstroke title six times (1991, 1992, 1993, 1994, 1998, 1999) and the 100 metres backstroke title six times (1990, 1991, 1992, 1993, 1994, 1999).

See also
 List of Commonwealth Games medallists in swimming (men)

References

1969 births
Living people
Commonwealth Games bronze medallists for England
Commonwealth Games gold medallists for England
Commonwealth Games medallists in swimming
Commonwealth Games silver medallists for England
English backstroke swimmers
English male swimmers
European Aquatics Championships medalists in swimming
Male backstroke swimmers
Medalists at the FINA World Swimming Championships (25 m)
Olympic swimmers of Great Britain
People from Bow, London
Swimmers at the 1992 Summer Olympics
Swimmers at the 1994 Commonwealth Games
Swimmers at the 1996 Summer Olympics
Swimmers at the 1998 Commonwealth Games
Swimmers at the 2002 Commonwealth Games
Medallists at the 1994 Commonwealth Games
Medallists at the 1998 Commonwealth Games